A lax is a salmon.

LAX as an acronym most commonly refers to Los Angeles International Airport in California.

LAX or Lax may also refer to:

Places

Within Los Angeles 
 Los Angeles Union Station, Los Angeles' main train depot, whose Amtrak station code is "LAX"
 The Port of Los Angeles, whose port identifier code is "LAX"

Other 
 Lax, Switzerland, a municipality of the canton of Valais
 Lax Lake (disambiguation)
 La Crosse, Wisconsin, a city on the Mississippi River

Sports
 Los Angeles Xtreme, a former American football team
 Lacrosse, a sport
 The Latin American Xchange, a professional wrestling stable

Media and entertainment
 LAX (album), the third studio album from rapper The Game
 LAX (TV series), a 2004–05 television series set in Los Angeles International Airport
 "LA X", the two-part sixth season 2010 premiere of the television show Lost
 LAX, a night club at Luxor Las Vegas
 "LAX", a song by the rapper Xzibit from Weapons of Mass Destruction
 "LAX", a song by Snoop Dogg featuring Ice Cube from Tha Blue Carpet Treatment
 "LAX", a song by Big D and the Kids Table on their album How It Goes
 "LAX", a song by Jake Owen from American Love
 "LAX", a song by Hawk Nelson from Crazy Love
 L.A.X., a disco studio act who released two albums on Prelude Records

Science and linguistics
 Laxative, a concoction that loosens the bowels
 Lax pair, a type of differential equation a pair of matrices that solve a differential equation, named after Peter Lax
 A lax vowel, one that lacks the quality of tenseness

People
 Anneli Cahn Lax (1922–1999), American mathematician
 Benjamin Lax (1915–2015), American physicist
 Gaspar Lax (1487–1560), Spanish mathematician, logician, and philosopher
 Peter Lax (born 1926), Hungarian-American mathematician
 Rick Lax (born 1982), American entertainer
 L.A.X (musician) (born 1993), Nigerian recording artist Damilola Afolabi

See also
 Laks (disambiguation)
 Lacs (disambiguation)
 Laax, a municipality in the district of Surselva in the Swiss canton of Graubünden
 Gravlax, a Nordic salmon dish